Nel De Crits (born 9 April 1991) is a Belgian former racing cyclist, who rode professionally for  between 2013 and 2016. De Crits rode at the 2014 UCI Road World Championships, and she finished fifth in the 2015 Dwars door Vlaanderen.

References

External links

1991 births
Living people
Belgian female cyclists
Place of birth missing (living people)